Dmytro Shutkov (born 3 April 1972) is a retired Ukrainian footballer who played in Ukrainian Premier League club Shakhtar Donetsk his entire career. Now he is a part of goalkeeper coaching staff of Shakhtar.

Career statistics

Club

External links
Dmytro Shutkov profile at FC Shakhtar Donetsk website.
 

1972 births
Living people
Footballers from Donetsk
Soviet footballers
Ukrainian footballers
Ukraine international footballers
FC Shakhtar Donetsk players
Soviet Top League players
Ukrainian Premier League players
Association football goalkeepers
FC Shakhtar Donetsk non-playing staff